Risto Pekka Kaskilahti (born 29 January 1963, in Viitasaari) is a Finnish actor.

Kaskilahti has worked in the Helsinki City Theatre since 2001, but he came to the public's attention as a regular competitor on Se on siinä, a humorous sports quiz show, of which screenwriter he has also been. He has also portrayed in several movies and TV-series.

In 2005, Kaskilahti was awarded his second Telvis-prize. When performing on Elixir, a Finnish sports-focused TV-show, he trained with the official Finnish cross-country skiing team. Occasionally a weatherman for the channel Four news, Kaskilahti has also acted in various plays at the Helsinki City Theatre, e.g. Viivi & Wagner and a Beauty and the Beast musical.

Risto Kaskilahti is married to actress Sari Puumalainen having two daughter, Saara and Siiri, with her.

Filmography
 Risto (2011)
 Takalinjan Takana  (2010)
 Blackout  (2008)
 Raja 1918 (2007)
 Riemukas Robinsonin perhe (voice) (2007)
 Ice Age: The Meltdown (voice) (2006)
 Saippuaprinssi (2006)
 Tahdon asia (2005)
 Saunavuoro (2004)
 Kansankynttilät
 Sibelius (2003)
 Klassikko (2001)
 Seitsemän (2001)
 Parhaat vuodet (2000)
 Hylätyt talot, autiot pihat (2000)
 Lakeuden kutsu (2000)
 Satumaa – Unto Monosen elämä ja tangot (1999)
 Johtaja Uuno Turhapuro – pisnismies (1998)
 Hämähäkkihuijaus (1998)
 Konstan koukkuja (1998)
 Siivoton juttu (1997)
 Aatamin poika (1996)
 Ottaako sydämestä? (1995)
 Peltiheikit (1995)
 Viimeiset siemenperunat
 Kun piru tuli polkupyörällä sepän tölliin ja sepän vaimo sai uuden nenän (1993)
 Tuntemattomalle jumalalle (1993)
 Hobitit (1993)
 Joulukalenteri (1993)
 Rölli – hirmuisia kertomuksia (1991)
 Paukavartti (early 90s)
 Yötyö (1988)

References

External links

1963 births
Living people
People from Viitasaari
Finnish male actors